Mikhail Tsvetkov (born 4 May 1980 in Ryazan) is a Russian high jumper.

He finished fourth at the 2003 World Championships in Saint-Denis near Paris, with a jump of 2.29 metres.

His personal best jump is 2.30 metres, achieved in July 2003 in Madrid.

External links

1980 births
Living people
Russian male high jumpers
Sportspeople from Ryazan
21st-century Russian people